Voyage of Rediscovery is a solo album by pianist Horace Parlan which was recorded in Denmark in 1999 and released on the Danish Storyville label.

Reception

The AllMusic review by Ken Dryden said "Voyage of Discovery is a rare opportunity to hear Horace Parlan playing solo piano, recorded over two sessions in early 1999. Parlan has plenty of surprises in store".

Track listing
 "Parker's Mood" (Charlie Parker) – 5:31
 "Broken Promises" (Horace Parlan) – 4:35
 "Two Sleepy People" (Hoagy Carmichael, Frank Loesser) – 7:01
 "I'm Getting Sentimental Over You" (George Bassman, Ned Washington) – 5:15
 "Déjà Vu" (Archie Shepp) – 5:29
 "Time for Love" (Johnny Mandel, Paul Francis Webster) – 6:57
 "Three Little Words" (Harry Ruby, Bert Kalmar) – 4:20	
 "Blood Count" (Billy Strayhorn) – 7:32
 "I Waited for You" (Dizzy Gillespie) – 6:40
 "Make Me a Pallet on the Floor" (Traditional) – 5:10
 "Pannonica" (Thelonious Monk) – 6:29
 "Melancholia" (Duke Ellington) – 6:21

Personnel
Horace Parlan – piano

References

1999 albums
Horace Parlan albums
Solo piano jazz albums
Storyville Records albums